Armiche Ortega Medina (born 12 June 1988 in Las Palmas, Canary Islands), known simply as Armiche, is a Spanish footballer who plays for CD Atlético Paso as an attacking midfielder.

References

External links

1988 births
Living people
Spanish footballers
Footballers from Las Palmas
Association football midfielders
Segunda División players
Segunda División B players
Tercera División players
Tercera Federación players
UD Las Palmas Atlético players
UD Las Palmas players
Benidorm CF footballers
Valencia CF Mestalla footballers
Barakaldo CF footballers
Burgos CF footballers
Super League Greece players
Football League (Greece) players
Levadiakos F.C. players
OFI Crete F.C. players
PAS Lamia 1964 players
Ekstraklasa players
MKS Cracovia (football) players
Liga I players
CS Pandurii Târgu Jiu players
Bolivian Primera División players
Sport Boys Warnes players
Cypriot Second Division players
Aris Limassol FC players
ASIL Lysi players
Spanish expatriate footballers
Expatriate footballers in Greece
Expatriate footballers in Poland
Expatriate footballers in Romania
Expatriate footballers in Bolivia
Expatriate footballers in Cyprus
Spanish expatriate sportspeople in Greece
Spanish expatriate sportspeople in Poland
Spanish expatriate sportspeople in Romania
Spanish expatriate sportspeople in Bolivia
Spanish expatriate sportspeople in Cyprus